William Henry Stevenson may refer to:

William H. Stevenson (1891–1978), a member of the United States House of Representatives 
W. H. Stevenson (1858–1924), English historian and philologist

See also
William Stevenson (disambiguation)